The Chandni Chowk, also known as Moonlight Square is one of the oldest and busiest markets in Old Delhi, India. It is located close to the Old Delhi Railway Station. The Red Fort monument is located at the eastern end of Chandni Chowk. It was built in the 17th century by Mughal Emperor of India Shah Jahan and designed by his daughter Jahanara. The market was once divided by canals (now closed) to reflect moonlight and remains one of India's largest wholesale markets.

History 

The market's history dates to the founding of the capital city of Shahjahanabad when Emperor Shah Jahan established the Red Fort on the banks of the Yamuna River besides his new capital.

Original Chandni Chowk

The original Chandni Chowk, half-moon-shaped square, was located in front of the Municipal Townhall and its reflection used to shine in the moonlit water pool located in front of it. A shallow water channel was built from Yamuna, which ran through the middle of the straight road currently known as the Chandani Chowk bazaar, with roads and shops on either side of the channel. This road had three bazaars. Chandni Chowk, or the Moonlight Square, and its three bazaars were designed and established by Princess Jahanara Begum, Shah Jahan's favourite daughter, in 1650 CE. Originally containing 1,560 shops, the bazaar was 40 yards wide by 1,520 yards long. The bazaar shaped as a square was given elegance by the presence of a pool in the centre of the complex. The pool shimmered in the moonlight, a feature which was responsible for its name. Shops were originally built in a half-moon shaped pattern, now lost. The bazaar was famous for its silver merchants, which also have contributed to the name of "Silver Street" as silver is referred to as Chandi in Hindi, a slight variation of which forms Chandni.

The pool in the chowk was replaced by a clock tower (Ghantaghar) in the 1950s. The centre of the market is still referred to as Ghantaghar. Chandni Chowk was once the grandest Indian market. Mughal imperial processions passed through Chandni Chowk. The tradition was continued when the Delhi Durbar was held in 1903. Delhi Town Hall was built in 1863 by the British.

Original three bazaars

The term Chandni Chowk originally referred only to the square that had a reflecting pool. Now the whole straight road which runs through the middle of the walled city, from the Lahori Gate of the Red Fort to Fatehpuri Masjid is called Chandni Chowk. The road was then divided into three following bazaars:

 Urdu Bazar: Lahori Gate of the Mughal royal palace to Chowk Kotwali near Gurudwara Sis Ganj Sahib was called Urdu Bazaar, i.e., the encampment market. The Urdu language received its name from this encampment. Ghalib noted the destruction of this market during the disturbances of the Indian Rebellion of 1857 and its aftermath.
 Johri Bazar: Chowk Kotwali to Chandni Chowk (location of now demolished Ghantaghar, presently in front of Municipal/Town Hall) section of the straight road was originally called Johri Bazar.
 Fatehpuri Bazar: 'Chandni Chowk' to Fatehpuri Masjid section of the straight road was originally called the Fatehpuri Bazar.

Now choked with congestion, the market retains its historical character.

Kucha, katra and havelis 
The road now called Chandni Chowk had several streets running off it which were called kuchas (streets/wings). Each Kucha usually had several katras (cul de sac or guild houses), which in turn had several haveli's. The following terms are generally used to describe the buildings and the streets:

 Mohalla (neighborhood): is a residential neighbourhood with Kuchas and Kartras within Kuchas.
 Kucha or Gali (street): Kucha in the Persian language is synonymous with "Gali" or street in the Hindi language. It is a street or a zone with houses whose owners shared some common attributes, usually their occupation. Hence the names Kucha Maliwara (the gardeners' street) and Kucha Ballimaran (the oarsmen's street). Kuchas either had rows of large Havelis or gated cul de sac (dead end) "Katra" marketplaces along with them.
 Kucha mahajani: is one of the biggest gold-trading hubs and wholesale jewellery markets in Asia.
 Katra (gated cul-de-sac courtyard market-cum-residential complex in a street): are one-room quarters around a court with a single narrow entrance and inhabited by people of the same caste or occupation i.e. a zone with houses whose owners shared some common attribute, usually their occupation, hence the name. Katra refers to a separate wing of tradesmen and craftsmen belonging to the same trade. They usually lived and worked together in a gated cul de sac, the doors of which could be closed at night for the protection of the merchandise, equipment, workers and their families. It is a system similar to the guild housing in Amsterdam such as Handboogdoelen and Voetboogdoelen.
 Haveli (mansion): A normal haveli has a big courtyard (atrium) surrounded on four sides by spacious rooms and often another walled courtyard around the exterior.  Historic havelis include:
 Begum Samru's palace built in 1806, now called Bhagirath Palace, see.
 Dharampura Haveli, Gali Guliyan, designed in late Mughal style although parts show the influence of 20 Century architecture. During Mughal and late Mughal Period, a large numbers of Havelis were built by courtiers. With increasing interest in Old Delhi by tourists, and to revive the old world charm of Purani Dilli, Haveli Dharmpura houses an Indian restaurant serving specialities of Mughal era with a contemporary touch, which you can enjoy with classical dance.
 Chunnamal haveli in Katra Neel
 Ghalib ki Haveli of Mirza Ghalib, Gali Qasim Jan (Gali Ballimaran)
 Haksar Haveli in Sita Ram Bazar, where Jawaharlal Nehru was married on 8 February 1916 to Kamla Nehru. She was born here, and her family sold it in the 1960s. Haveli used to host mushairas
 Haveli Banarsi Bhawan with a water well is situated near to Shree Digambar Meru Jain Temple in the Masjid Khajoor area.
 Haveli Naharwali, Kucha Sadullah Khan, where Pervez Musharraf, former president of Pakistan was born and his grandfather sold it to Prem Chand Gola after whom this area is now called Gola Market. This was originally owned by the Raja Nahar Khan a Hindu convert of Mewat who converted to Islam during the era of Firuz Shah Tughlaq in 1355, hence the name.
Khazanchi haveli, the Khajanchi were the accountants of Shah Jahan. A street is named after them called "Gali Khajanchi", a long tunnel connects the haveli and the Red Fort, so that money could be transferred safely. It is close to the entrance of Chandni Chowk, from the Red Fort walk towards Fatehpuri, turn left on road to Dariba and the haveli is at the end of the road that connects Dariba and Esplanade Road.
 Haveli Raja Jugal Kishore, a grand mansion with an imposing gate, which was adorned with a large ghanta-bell. Located adjacent to the gate, a room in the haveli opening towards the street, was given to Lala Sukhlal by the owners of the haveli as a philanthropic gesture to open a sweet shop, which came to be identified as ghante ke neechewala halwaii. (see Ghantewala). A street is named after the haveli; Kucha-i-Haveli Raja Jugal Kishore between Kucha Maliwara and Kotwali Chabutra.
Naughara Mansions in Naughara Gali off Kinari Bazaar has 18th century Jain mansions. It is a street with nine (nau) continuous havelies with brightly painted floral designs on the facade. Each of the havelies used to have a gharha (water pot) placed at door for the thirsty passersby. There is a white marble Jain Svetambara Temple at the end of the street with stone elephant heads at the door, intricate carvings on walls and pillars, a museum on the ground floor with rare manuscripts embroidered in pure gold and silver threads and a black image of Lord Parasanath in the rare kasauti stone on the first floor. Office of Atma Prakash Aggrawal at the beginning of the street houses numerous antiques and should not be mistaken as an antique shop.
 Zeenat Mahal Haveli, Lal Kuan Bazar

Some other commonly used terms are Chatta (the upper floor which arches over the street below), phatak (door, usually to a katra or street which could be locked at night), mahal (a palace, as in Taj Mahal), kamra (a room), kuan is waterwell, etc.

Historic religious buildings 

Delhi's most famous mosque, Jama Masjid, built-in 1650 in the vicinity, is near other religious shrines, belonging to multiple religions. Starting from the Red Fort, the buildings include:

 The Sri Digambar Jain Lal Mandir, established in 1656 with a bird hospital established in 1929. A Naya Mandir was built in 1807 in Dharampura, as the first temple with a Shikhar.
 The Gauri Shankar Temple was built by a Maratha general Appa Gangadhar according to one of the legends.
 The Central Baptist Church, it was built-in 1814.
 The Gurdwara Sis Ganj Sahib. The ninth Sikh Guru, Guru Tegh Bahadur and his followers Bhai Mati Das, Bhai Dyal Das and Bhai Sati Das were executed nearby by the Mughals in 1675. The Gurudwaras in the form of memorials were built in 1783 after Delhi, the then Mughal capital was captured by the Khalsa (the corporate body of Sikhs) under the command of Baghel Singh. Present Building was however built later in 1930.
 The Sunehri Masjid was built in 1721 by Roshan-Ud-Daula Zafar Khan in the reign of Mohammad Shah. Persian invader Nader Shah spent several hours on the top of the mosque on 11 March 1739 to observe the Katl-e-Aam (the killing of everyone in sight) that he had ordered, which resulted in 30,000 deaths.
 The Fatehpuri Masjid was built by Fatehpuri Begum in 1650, one of the queens of Shah Jahan.

Present 
On both sides of the wide Chandni Chowk are historical residential areas served by narrow lanes (gali), several of which are teeming with the peddlers, street vendors, street food and bazaars.

Shops 

Chandni Chowk's speciality is its variety and authenticity: food, delicacies and sweets of more than 1,000 kinds, sarees with chikan and zari. Narrow lanes host shops that sell books, clothing, electronics, consumer goods, shoes and leather goods. It is the location of the original Haldiram's and brands such as Giani's. A particular local delicacy is the jalebis, which are fried in pure ghee (clarified butter).

Starting from the Red Fort end one finds the State Bank of India building. A short distance away is Bhagirath Palace Begum Samru which has an intriguing history. Bhagirath Palace and the adjoining area have perhaps the biggest market in India for electrical goods, lamps and light fixtures.Also for medical essentials and related products.Dariba Kalan is the market for silver and gold jewellery. This market also offers trophies, shields, mementos and related items. At its Southern end (and close to the Jama Masjid, Delhi) is Bazaar Guliyan where about a hundred shops selling metallic and wooden statues, sculptures, bells, handicrafts are located. Nai Sarak is the wholesale market for stationery, books, paper and decorative materials. Chawri Bazar is a big market for greeting and wedding cards as well as plumbing and sanitary ware and accessories. Lal Kuan is a wholesale market for hardware and hotel kitchen equipment. Located at the western end of Chandni Chowk, Khari Baoli is a street entirely dedicated to all kinds of spices, dried fruits, nuts, herbs, grains, lentils, pickles and preserves/murabbas. Tilak Bazaar is a wholesale market for industrial chemicals. The Cloth Market supplies home furnishing fabrics, including ready-made items as well as design services.

Restaurants and eateries 

 Paranthewali Gali with paratha shops from 1875 to 1886.
 Annapurna Bhandar established in 1929 by Late Mr.Purna Chander Modak is popular for Bengali sweets.
 Bikaner Sweet Shop, known for rasmalai.
 Chaatwallah, established in 1923, known for fruit chaat.
 Chaina Ram Sindhi Halwai, established in 1948 serves besan ke laddoo, ghee patisa and ghevar like none in the city.
 Giani's, serving icecreams and Rabri Falooda, established around 1947.
 Gol Hatti, established in 1954, serves kullhad wale chhole chawal.
 Hazari Lal Khurchan Wale, Kinaari Bazaar. This shop, established 90 years ago, arguably makes the best khurchan in Delhi. Khurchan means ”scraped leftovers" in Hindi.
 Kanwarji Bhagirathmal Dalbijiwallah established in the mid-19th century.
 Meghraj and Sons, since the 1950s
 Natraj's Dahi Bhalle, established in 1940.
 Shiv Mishtan Bhandar, established 1910, is well known for their bedmi pooree with aloo sabzi with crisp jalebi or imarti. A limited menu but every item is freshly prepared and full of flavour.
 Tewari Brothers Confectioners, (known for Motichoor Laddoo, Samosa) established in 1987
 The Old Famous Jalebi Wala, which is situated in Dariba Kalan, serves city's crispiest jalebis.

In popular culture
Chandni Chowk was featured in the 2001 Bollywood film Kabhi Khushi Kabhie Gham where the leading lady Anjali (Kajol) and her sister Pooja (Kareena Kapoor) lived.

In 2008, The Bollywood movie Black & White starring Anil Kapoor, Anurag Sinha, Shefali Chhaya, and Aditi Sharma is set in Chandni Chowk.

In 2009, The Bollywood movie Chandni Chowk to China starring Akshay Kumar, Deepika Padukone, Mithun Chakraborty, and Ranvir Shorey features some scenes depicting the city. In 2009, The Bollywood movie Delhi-6 starring Abhishek Bachchan, Sonam Kapoor, Waheeda Rehman, Om Puri, Atul Kulkarni and Divya Dutta had its shooting in the ancient Walled City of Old Delhi, centered around Chandni Chowk.

In 2016, The Bollywood movie Saat Uchakkey starring Manoj Bajpayee, Kay Kay Menon, Annu Kapoor, Vijay Raaz, Anupam Kher, Jatin Sarna, Aparshakti Khurana and Aditi Sharma was completely shot in and around Chandni Chowk.

In 2018, the Bollywood movie Rajma Chawal starring Amyra Dastur, Rishi Kapoor, Aparshakti Khurana, Raja Hasan, Mukesh Chhabra, Nirmal Rishi, Harish Khanna had its extensive section of the film shot in Lachu Ram Ki Haveli.

In 2019, the Bollywood movie The Sky is Pink starring Priyanka Chopra, Farhan Akhtar, Zaira Wasim, Rohit Suresh Saraf was partially shot in Chandni Chowk as the main characters of the story, Priyanka and Farhan lived here.

Redevelopment 

Chandni Chowk was redeveloped as heritage trail to promote tourism getting inspiration from Heritage Street Amritsar. Shahjahanabad Redevelopment Corporation, under the auspices of the Government of the NCT of Delhi, is the agency carrying out this task. The redevelopment plan includes footpaths to make the area more pedestrian-friendly for a large number of shoppers and visitors. No motorized traffic will be allowed on Chandni Chowk from Red Fort to Fatehpuri Masjid in the day time. Roads are also planned to be decongested and some will be barricaded. People who want to come there will have to use the Ebus. The redevelopment plan was supposed to have been completed before the 2010 Commonwealth Games but has been delayed for various reasons. Delhi government is now pushing it seriously. The redevelopment plan is being implemented under Deputy Chief Minister Manish Sisodia. The Plan also includes extra parking for 1500 cars.

As a part of the redevelopment, a multilevel parking cum commercial complex is coming up at Gandhi Maidan in Chandni Chowk. The project was inaugurated by Union minister of science and technology, Dr. Harshvardhan.

This multilevel parking cum commercial complex would be an eight-storeyed building with three basements covering 18,524 square meter area at a cost of Rs 1,000 crore on a PPP model with a Leading Real estate developer Omaxe. The project that has a capacity to accommodate over 2,300 cars.

See also

References

Citations

Further reading
 Delhi, the emperor's city: rediscovering Chandni Chowk and its environs, by Vijay Goel. Lustre Press, 2003. .

External links

Old Delhi dictionary and introduction to the names of places
Shri Digambar Jain Lal Mandir - Birds Hospital
Shri Shiv Navgrah Mandir Dham
Shri Gauri Shankar Mandir
Chandni Chowk's website
Bhavana Muttreja, Traditional Dwelling Analysis of Chandni Chowk, Archinomy website

17th-century establishments in India
Bazaars in India
History of Delhi
Neighbourhoods in Delhi
Populated places established in the 17th century
Retail markets in Delhi